Gigablast is an American free and open-source web search engine and directory. Founded in 2000, it is an independent engine and web crawler, developed and maintained by Matt Wells, a former Infoseek employee and New Mexico Tech graduate.

The search engine source code is written in the programming languages C and C++. It was released as open-source software under the Apache License version 2, in July 2013. In 2015, Gigablast claimed to have indexed over 12 billion web pages.

Gigablast has provided, and provides, search results to other companies, such as Ixquick, Clusty, Zuula, Snap, Blingo, and Internet Archive.

Background
Matt Wells worked for the Infoseek search engine until he left in 1999, to start working on what would become Gigablast, coding everything from scratch in C++. It was originally designed to index up to 200 billion web pages. Gigablast went into beta form on July 21, 2002.

Features
Gigablast supports various specialized searches and Boolean algebra operators. It also supports a related-concepts feature called Giga Bits and a blog-search feature.

A feature called Gigabits provides relevant information in addition to what the user is searching for.

Gigablast also claims to be, as of 2010, the "leading" clean energy search engine with 90 percent of its power coming from wind energy.

Acquisition
In 2013, it was reported that Yippy had agreed to acquire Gigablast Inc. However, later on, Gigablast author Matt Wells said that no acquisition took place and that Gigablast remains independent.

Critical reception 
In 2003, The New York Times columnist Lee Dembart stated that "Gigablast has its adherents", but opined that Google is "head and shoulders" above it, and adds that Google's search results are more complete. In 2016, a Lifewire reviewer felt that Gigablast is easy to use and liked the Gigabits feature.

See also 

 Comparison of web search engines
 List of search engines

References

Bibliography

 
 Mary Ellen Bates, "Gigablast Blasts Off Again", Online, May/Jun 2008 abstract 
 Scan of Business 2.0 coverage of Matt Wells and Gigablast

External links
 

Internet search engines
Companies based in New Mexico
Free search engine software
Software using the Apache license